The following is a list of mayors of Roanoke, Virginia. This list includes the mayors of the former town Big Lick, Virginia, which was later incorporated as the city of Roanoke on February 3, 1882. Because of the current weak mayor-city manager system in Roanoke, the mayor is the "first among equals" on the Roanoke City Council.

Mayors of the town of Big Lick:

Elected mayors following incorporation as the City of Roanoke:

See also
 Timeline of Roanoke, Virginia

References
 The City of Roanoke. Chronology of Mayors on the 4th floor of the Noel C. Taylor Municipal Building.

Roanoke, Virginia